The Prison and Probation Administration (Icelandic: Fangelsismálastofnun ríkisins) is the national correctional agency of Iceland. Along with the Icelandic National Police, Directorate of Customs, and the Icelandic Coast Guard, the Icelandic Prison Service is one of the few law-enforcement agencies in Iceland. The current Director General of the Prison and Probation Administration is Páll Egill Winkel.

Mission and role
The mission and role of the Prison and Probation Administration is;
 To supervise the execution of sentences and other functions in accordance with the provisions of the Execution of Sentences Act No. 15/2016  and regulations issued thereunder.
 Responsible for the management of prisons.
 To supervise those who are serving their sentence through community services and are subject to electronic surveillance. The PPA may, according to an agreement, refer those tasks to others.
 To supervise persons whose prosecution proceedings have been deferred with supervision and those who have been given suspended sentences with supervision or who have been pardoned with supervision. The PPA can entrust it to another party.
 To supervise and be responsible for health services and other services that prisoners are entitled to have according to other laws and regulations.

History
The current Prison and Probation Administration was formed in 1989 at the merger of other agencies after an assessment of the state of prisons and rehabilitation in Iceland.

Power and authority of prison staff
Prison staff may use force in carrying out their duties if this is considered necessary in order to:
 Prevent an escape
 Defend themselves against an imminent attack, overpower violent resistance, prevent a prisoner from harming himself or others and to prevent acts of vandalism.
 To follow orders that need to be carried out immediately and a prisoner refuses or neglects to comply with instructions regarding them.
 Force may involve physical holding or the use of the appropriate defensive equipment.

Prisons in Iceland

The PPA operates five prisons currently. The PPA has the ability to house 153 inmates, the largest being the prison at Hólmsheiði which has the ability to house 53 prisoners. The prison at Hólmsheiði, which was opened in 2016 is the first purpose built prison in Iceland since 1874.

Aside from Fangelsið Akureyri, which is in the northern city of Akureyri, prisons in Iceland are all located in the southwest end of the country. This includes the oldest prison, Hegningarhúsið, which is located in downtown Reykjavík. This roughly corresponds with the country's population centres.

Ranks

Uniforms
The present uniform of the PPA is a black shirt or a polo shirt with black trousers. Also available are various jackets. Uniform is to be worn with epaulettes.

The image displays the former shoulder patch of the Icelandic Prison Service. The present shoulder patch is black with gold lettering and outlining.

See also
 Military of Iceland
 Icelandic Police
 Directorate of Customs

References

External links
 Fangelsi.is (in Icelandic)

Government agencies of Iceland